is a Japanese former cyclist. He competed in the team pursuit event at the 1988 Summer Olympics. He later rode for the Nippon Hodo Racing Team (a precursor of Team Nippo), and after retiring, served as a coach for the Japan Cycling Federation.

References

1969 births
Living people
Japanese male cyclists
Olympic cyclists of Japan
Cyclists at the 1988 Summer Olympics
Sportspeople from Wakayama Prefecture
Asian Games medalists in cycling
Asian Games gold medalists for Japan
Cyclists at the 1990 Asian Games
Medalists at the 1990 Asian Games